Judicael or Judicaël is a Breton masculine given name. It may refer to:

 Saint Judicael (7th century), king of Domnonia and high king of Brittany
 Judicael, Duke of Brittany (9th century)
 Judicael Berengar (10th century), count of Rennes
 Judicaël Perroy

See also
 Juhel, a French variant of the name
Judicaëlle or Judicaelle is the feminine name